Gurania is a genus of flowering plants belonging to the family Cucurbitaceae.

Its native range is Mexico to Southern Tropical America.

Species
Species:

Gurania acuminata 
Gurania bignoniacea 
Gurania brevipedunculata 
Gurania calathina 
Gurania candolleana 
Gurania capitata 
Gurania cinerea 
Gurania cogniauxiana 
Gurania crinita 
Gurania eriantha 
Gurania gracilis 
Gurania guentheri 
Gurania huberi 
Gurania huebneri 
Gurania insolita 
Gurania jeffreyi 
Gurania lignosa 
Gurania lobata 
Gurania longiflora 
Gurania longipetala 
Gurania makoyana 
Gurania malacophylla 
Gurania neei 
Gurania nigrescens 
Gurania ovata 
Gurania oxyphylla 
Gurania paulista 
Gurania pedata 
Gurania pseudospinulosa 
Gurania pycnocephala 
Gurania reticulata 
Gurania rhizantha 
Gurania robusta 
Gurania rufipila 
Gurania sellowiana 
Gurania simplicifolia 
Gurania sinuata 
Gurania smithii 
Gurania spruceana 
Gurania suberosa 
Gurania subumbellata 
Gurania trialata 
Gurania tricuspidata 
Gurania tubulosa 
Gurania vaupesana 
Gurania velutina 
Gurania villosa 
Gurania wawrae

References

Cucurbitaceae
Cucurbitaceae genera